William Wood (19 October 1878–1947) was an English footballer who played in the Football League for Bury. Wood scored in both the 1900 FA Cup Final and 1903 FA Cup Final.

References

1878 births
1947 deaths
English footballers
Association football forwards
English Football League players
Bury F.C. players
Fulham F.C. players
Norwich City F.C. players
Leyton F.C. players
Gillingham F.C. players
FA Cup Final players